The Berliner Tageblatt or BT was a German language newspaper published in Berlin from 1872 to 1939. Along with the Frankfurter Zeitung, it became one of the most important liberal German newspapers of its time.

History

The Berliner Tageblatt was first published by Rudolf Mosse as an advertising paper on 1 January 1872, but developed into a liberal newspaper. On 5 January 1919 the office of the newspaper was briefly occupied by Freikorps soldiers in the German Revolution. By 1920, the BT had achieved a daily circulation of about 245,000.

Prior to the National Socialist administration taking office on 30 January 1933, the newspaper was particularly critical and hostile to their program. On 3 March 1933, after the Reichstag fire, Rudolf Mosse's son-in-law, Hans Lachmann-Mosse, the publisher, dismissed editor in chief Theodor Wolff because of his criticism of the Nazi government and his Jewish ancestry. Wolff by then fled to the Tyrol in Austria by plane.

After 1933, the National Socialist government took control of the newspaper (the Gleichschaltung). However, in September 1933, special permission was granted by Propaganda Minister Joseph Goebbels to release the paper from any obligation to reprint Nazi propaganda in order to help portray an image of a free German press internationally. Due to this assurance, their respected foreign correspondent Paul Scheffer became editor on 1 April 1934. He had been the first foreign journalist to be refused a re-entry permit into the Soviet Union in 1929 for his critical reporting on the five-year plan and prophecy of famine in Ukraine.

For almost two years, Scheffer surrounded himself by independently minded university graduates such as Margaret Boveri. She wrote in 1960 that Scheffer "was hated from the beginning by leading people of the Propaganda Ministry, and it was only because of his excellent foreign connections that he was not relieved of his position in the early years of the regime". Scheffer's position eventually became untenable, and he resigned on 31 December 1936.

The paper was finally shut down by the Nazi authorities on 31 January 1939.

Contributors
During the 27 years (1906–1933) when Theodor Wolff was editor in chief, the BT became the most influential newspaper in Berlin. Wolff brought the elite of German journalism to the Berliner Tageblatt. Ernst Feder and Rudolf Olden ran the domestic politics section, while Josef Schwab, Max Jordan, and Maximilian Müller-Jabusch handled foreign politics. Arthur Norden and Felix Pinner were responsible for the business section. Fred Hildenbrandt headed the feuilleton section from 1922 to 1932. Regular contributors to the feuilleton included Alfred Polgar, Fritz Mauthner, Kurt Tucholsky, Erich Kästner, Robert Walser, Etta Federn, Otto Flake, Felix Hirsch and Frank Thiess. The chief of the theatre section was Alfred Kerr.

From 1918 until April 1920, Kurt Tucholsky contributed 50 articles to the Berliner Tageblatt while he was also editor in chief of the satirical magazine Ulk, which appeared weekly between 1913 and 1933. His novel Schloss Gripsholm (set near Gripsholm Castle) appeared in the BT from 20 March to 26 April 1931. Alfred Eisenstaedt was one of the newspaper's photographers.

Erich Everth began corresponding from the BT from Vienna in 1924. As the successor of Leopold Schmidt, Alfred Einstein was the musical critic from September 1927 until August 1933. Starting in 1925, Walter Zadek was a literary editor. Arrested in 1933 and tortured by the Nazis, Zadek then fled to Jerusalem, where he became a well-known photographer. The head of the important Central European Office from 1927 to 1933 was Heinrich Eduard Jacob, based in Vienna. During his time at the BT, Jacob had approximately 1,000 contributions. Because he was an opponent of the Austrian Nazis, Jacob was imprisoned at Dachau concentration camp after the Anschluss in 1938.

The BT published separate weekly magazines, distributed as part of the newspaper.  A number of these, such as "Technische Rundschau," a weekly review of trends in technology, and the "Haus, Hof und Garten" sections (Home and Garden), were edited by Rudolf Jonas.  Jonas was an editor from 1929 to 1932 and later became an editor of the magazine Das Theater.

Circulation

References

External links
 Digitised version of Berliner Tageblatt from 1878 to 1929 -

1872 establishments in Germany
1939 disestablishments in Germany
Defunct newspapers published in Germany
German-language newspapers
Liberalism in Germany
Newspapers published in Berlin
Publications established in 1872
Publications disestablished in 1939